White spider or variation, may refer to:

 The White Spider (1963 film) West German crime drama film
 The White Spider (1927 film) German silent film
 White Spider (2005 song), a song by Anthony Phillips from the album Field Day (Anthony Phillips album)
 The White Spider (1959 book) non-fiction Swiss mountaineering book about the first successful climb of the North Face of the Eiger
 The White Spider, an icefield on the north face of the Swiss mountain Eiger
 White spider flower (Grevillea albiflora) an Australian shrub
 White spider lily (Lycoris albiflora) a flower species of lily genus Lycoris (plant)
 White spider orchid (Caladenia longicauda) an Australian orchid
 Caladenia rigida (white spider-orchid) an Australian orchid
 White Spider (cocktail), the vodka variation of the Stinger (cocktail)
 White Spider Demon (character), a fictional character from the 2002 TV series The Monkey King: Quest for the Sutra
 The White Spider (character), a fictional character from the 1921 Western film serial The White Horseman

See also

 White-tailed spider, Australian spiders of genus Lampona and species cylindrata and murina
 White Lady (spider) (Leucorchestris arenicola)
 
 White (disambiguation)
 Spider (disambiguation)